Angela Payne (born November 6, 1984) is an American rock climber specializing in bouldering, who won a clean sweep of the 2003-2004 US American Bouldering Series, and who in 2010, became the first-ever female in history to climb an  boulder.

Early years
Payne was born and raised in Cincinnati, Ohio. She began indoor sport climbing at the age of 11, and competed in a number of junior sport climbing competitions before switching to bouldering at age 15 to 16. Payne says that her early idols were Lynn Hill, and as she began to focus on bouldering, Lisa Rands. In 2003, she moved to Boulder to attend college at the University of Colorado Boulder to study veterinary science, graduating in 2010.

Climbing career

Competition climbing
Aged 19, and in her first year in college, Payne won a clean sweep of all three of the American Bouldering Series 5, national championship events, (and thus became the overall ABS 5 champion), and two Professional Climbers Association (PCA) competitions, (and also the overall PCA championship), for the 2003-2004 boulder season. Payne finished second overall (2012), and third overall (2006, 2007, and 2015) in the annual US Bouldering Open National Championships (what the ABS became post-2004).  Amongst other podiums and victories in individual competitions,(e.g. the 2006 SENDFEST in Salt Lake City, and the 2010 Triple Crown Series at Horse Pens 40 in Steele, Alabama), in 2013, Payne won the Hueco Rock Rodeo at Hueco Tanks, in Texas.

Bouldering

In early 2008, Payne climbed Chbalank in Hueco Tanks at V11/V12, and in September 2008, she climbed Dave Graham's European Human Being in the Rocky Mountain National Park (RMNP) at "hard"  and her first V12. In February 2009, she climbed Atomic Playboy in Fontainebleau in France, another . In June 2010, she climbed Clear Blue Skies, and made the first female ascent of No More Green Grasses, at Mount Evans, both at grade .  

On August 17, 2010, Payne became the first-ever female in history to complete a confirmed  boulder, with her ascent of The Automator in the RMNP (Anna Stöhr would complete the second-ever female ascent of an 8B (V13) just one month later). She won a second honourable mention in Climbing magazine's 2010 Golden Piton Awards.  In 2012, Payne, rock climber Ethan Pringle, and mountainer Mike Libecki went to the Kangertittivatsiaq fjord in south east Greeland on a bouldering and climbing expedition. In July 2014, Payne sent her second  boulder, Freaks of the Industry, in Lower Chaos Canyon in the RMNP, a project she had spent several seasons working on, and which she ranked as one of the achievements she was most proud of in her career.

Rock climbing

In 2015, Payne branched into big wall climbing, ascending the 3,264-foot spire of Poumaka in French Polynesia, with Libecki, which was captured in the film, Poumaka (2016).

Personal life
In 2016, Payne was working for USA Climbing. She is a keen amateur photographer.

Payne has spoken openly about the prevalence of eating disorders in her sport, and contributes prominently to a documentary on the subject called Light (2021), by Caroline Treadway.

Bibliography
Women Who Dare: North America's Most Inspiring Women Climbers (Chris Noble), 2013, Falcon Guides. page 173–185. .
Better Bouldering, 2nd Edition, (John Sherman), 2011, Falcon Guides. Chapter 12: A Woman's Perspective (Angie Payne) .

Filmography
 Award winning documentary on eating disorders in climbing : 
 Documentary on ascent of her ascent of Poumaka : 
 Documentary on leading climbers featuring Payne : 
 Documentary on leading climbers featuring Payne :

See also 
History of rock climbing
List of first ascents (sport climbing)
Alex Puccio, American bouldering climber
Alex Johnson, American bouldering climber

References

External links
 
 
 

1984 births
Living people
American rock climbers
American female climbers
Female climbers
American sportswomen
21st-century American women
Sportspeople from Cincinnati
University of Colorado Boulder alumni
Boulder climbers